Guilty 'til Proved Innocent! is a 1998 album by The Specials. It is the first studio album of new songs by the group since 1984, with songs written by both original and new group members.  As in their previous album and tours during this era, the line-up featured original band members Neville Staple, Roddy Byers, Lynval Golding, and Horace Panter joined by new members Mark Adams, Adam Birch, and Jon Read.  The album also featured drummer Charley Harrington Bembridge, who had been absent from Today's Specials but had been playing live with the group since 1994.
While inevitably suffering comparisons to the music released by the classic 1979-1981 line up, Guilty... received far more favourable reviews than the reunited band's previous studio effort, the covers album Today's Specials, and was generally heralded as a return to form.

The song "It's You" was released as a single promoted on Modern Rock radio stations upon the album's release. "Running Away" is based on the Toots & the Maytals song "Monkey Man," which the Specials covered on their 1979 debut album.

Track listing

Personnel
Roddy Byers – vocals, guitar
Lynval Golding – guitar, vocals
Horace Panter – bass guitar
Neville Staple – vocals
Mark Adams – organ, piano, backing vocals
Charley H. Bembridge – drums (credited as Harrington Bembridge)
Adam Birch – trombone, trumpet, backing vocals
Jon Read – trumpet, accordion
Tim Armstrong – vocals on "Fearful"
Lars Frederiksen – vocals on "Fearful"
Technical
Stoker – producer, mixing, engineer
Billy Bowers – assistant engineer
Mike McQuaid – assistant engineer
Paul Q. Kolderie – mixing
Sean Slade – mixing
Mark Trombino – mixing
Thom Wilson – mixing
Scott Gutierrez – mixing assistant
Gavin Lurssen – mastering
Shepard Fairey – artwork, art direction, design, layout design, photography
Dave Kinsey – art direction, design, layout design

References

1998 albums
The Specials albums
MCA Records albums